Arthur Adams may refer to:

Arthur Adams (zoologist) (1820–1878), English physician, naturalist, and malacologist
Arthur Henry Adams (1872–1936), New Zealand writer
Arthur Adams (spy) (1885–1969), Soviet spy
Artie Adams (Arthur Henry Adams, 1891–1969), Australian rules footballer for South Melbourne
Arthur S. Adams (1896–1980), American university president
Edward Adams (footballer) (Arthur Edward Adams, 1908–1981), English footballer who played for Tranmere Rovers
Arthur Adams (singer) (born 1943), American blues guitarist and singer
Arthur Adams (comics) (born 1963), American comic book artist
Arthur A. Adams, mayor of Springfield, Massachusetts, 1919–1920

See also
Adams (surname)